Pseudothaumaspis is a genus of Asian bush crickets belonging to the tribe Meconematini: in the subfamily Meconematinae.  AV Gorochov originally placed these species as a subgenus of Thaumaspis.

Species 
The Orthoptera Species File lists the following species, found in eastern China and Viet Nam:
 Pseudothaumaspis bispinosus Wang & Liu, 2014
 Pseudothaumaspis furcocercus Wang & Liu, 2014
 Pseudothaumaspis gialaiensis (Gorochov, 1998) – type species (locality: near Buon Luoi village, Gia Lai, Vietnam)

References

External links 
Image of Pseudothaumaspis-furcocercus at Researchgate

Tettigoniidae genera
Meconematinae
Orthoptera of Indo-China